CashTree is an interbank network in India founded by five public sector banks, Syndicate Bank, Bank of India, Indian Bank, United Bank of India and Union Bank of India, for sharing their Automated Teller Machine (ATM) networks.

The network was founded in 2003, with Dena Bank later joining the network.

Members
Bank of India
Dena Bank
Indian Bank
Syndicate Bank
United Bank of India 
Union Bank of India

Competitors
 Cashnet
 MITR
 BANCS

References

Interbank networks in India